Sherman Lee Johnson (born July 15, 1990) is an American former professional baseball infielder. He played in Major League Baseball (MLB) for one season with the Los Angeles Angels. He currently serves as the hitting coach for the Bowie Baysox in the Baltimore Orioles organization.

Professional career

Los Angeles Angels
After graduating from Braulio Alonso High School in Tampa, Florida, Johnson enrolled at Florida State University where he played college baseball for the Florida State Seminoles. In 2012, as a junior at FSU, he batted .263 with five home runs and 38 RBIs in 67 games (all starts). Johnson was drafted by the Angels in the 14th round of the 2012 MLB Draft and signed.

After signing with the Angels, Johnson was assigned to the Orem Owlz and spent the whole season there, batting .269 with three home runs and twenty RBIs in 54 games. In 2013, he played with the Burlington Bees and the Inland Empire 66ers, posting a combined .264 batting average with four home runs, 34 RBIs, and 23 doubles in 111 games, and in 2014, he played for Inland Empire where he compiled a .276 batting average with 17 home runs, 78 RBIs, and an .847 OPS in 136 games. Sherman spent 2015 with the Arkansas Travelers where he batted .204 with seven home runs and 53 RBIs in 135 games, 2016 with both Arkansas and the Salt Lake Bees where he collected a combined .246 batting average with 12 home runs, 54 RBIs, and 21 doubles in 127 games, and 2017 with Salt Lake and the Mobile BayBears where he posted a combined .258 batting average with five home runs and 57 RBIs in 120 games.

Johnsonbegan 2018 with Salt Lake. The Angels promoted him to the major leagues on September 18, and he made his major league debut the next day. He was outrighted to the minors on November 1, 2018. He elected free agency on November 2.

Cincinnati Reds
On February 11, 2019, Johnson signed a minor league deal with the Cincinnati Reds. Appearing in 71 games for the Triple-A Louisville Bats, he hit .241/.353/.355 with 4 home runs, 15 RBI, and 4 stolen bases. On July 31, Johnson was released by the Reds organization.

Pittsburgh Pirates
On February 29, 2020, Johnson signed a minor league deal with the Pittsburgh Pirates. He did not play in a game in 2020 due to the cancellation of the minor league season because of the COVID-19 pandemic. Johnson was released by the Pirates organization on June 9.

Kane County Cougars
On March 24, 2021, Johnson signed with the Kane County Cougars of the American Association of Professional Baseball. However, he left the Cougars on May 12, 2021 without having played a game for them.

Minnesota Twins
On May 12, 2021, Johnson signed a minor league contract with the Minnesota Twins organization. Johnson appeared in 75 games split between the Double-A Wichita Wind Surge and the Triple-A St. Paul Saints, posting a cumulative .202/.353/.332 with 5 home runs, 33 RBI, and 3 stolen bases. He elected free agency following the season on November 7.

Kane County Cougars (second stint)
On April 5, 2022, Johnson signed with the Kane County Cougars of the American Association of Professional Baseball. Johnson appeared in 90 games for the Cougars, slashing .231/.385/.416 with 13 home runs and 52 RBI. He was released on November 3, 2022.

Coaching career
On February 2, 2023, Johnson was announced as the hitting coach for the Bowie Baysox, the Double-A affiliate of the Baltimore Orioles.

References

External links

1990 births
Living people
Baseball players from Tampa, Florida
African-American baseball players
Major League Baseball infielders
Los Angeles Angels players
Florida State Seminoles baseball players
Orem Owlz players
Burlington Bees players
Inland Empire 66ers of San Bernardino players
Arkansas Travelers players
Salt Lake Bees players
Mobile BayBears players
Venados de Mazatlán players
American expatriate baseball players in Mexico
Louisville Bats players
Wichita Wind Surge players
St. Paul Saints players
21st-century African-American sportspeople
Kane County Cougars players